Named after the Bengali poet, Sukanta Bhattacharya, Sukanta Mancha is an auditorium in Kolkata, India. Cultural programmes are organized in the hall. It is located at CIT Road or Hem Chandra Naskar Road near Phulbagan Crossing.

References

External links
 Reference to Sukanta Mancha

Auditoriums in Kolkata